Rozenburg wind wall in Rozenburg, Netherlands, is a wall built to block wind from entering the Calandkanaal, and ease the passage of large cargo ships through the narrow canal, particularly through the Calandbrug bridge. The wall blocks about 75% of the wind and allows the ships to pass smoothly. The wall is 1600 meters long and it is made up of 125 rectangular and cylindrical slabs, each about 25 meters tall and 18 meters wide.

References

Buildings and structures in Rotterdam